State Route 44 (SR 44) is a  state highway in Marion County, Alabama in the northwest part of the U.S. state of Alabama. The southern terminus of the highway is at its intersection with US 43/SR 118 at Guin. The highway’s eastern terminus is at its intersection with SR 129 at Brilliant.

Route description
SR 44 is routed along a two-lane roadway for its entire length. The highway serves as a connector between Guin and Brilliant, traveling through rural areas of Marion County. Roughly  before its eastern terminus, the highway has an interchange with I-22/US 78.

Major intersections

See also

References

044
Transportation in Marion County, Alabama